The Martin XB-33 Super Marauder was a proposed World War II American bomber aircraft. It was designed by the Glenn L. Martin Company as the Martin Model 190 and was a high-altitude derivative of the company's B-26 Marauder. Two different designs were developed, first as a twin-engined aircraft and then as a four-engined aircraft. The four-engined version was ordered by the United States Army Air Forces, but the program was cancelled before any aircraft were built.

Design and development

XB-33

The first version of the B-33 design, the XB-33, was a twin-tailed medium bomber with two Wright R-3350 engines and pressurised crew compartments; its design began in 1940. It would carry around 4,000 lb (1,814 kg) of bombs. Soon after design of the XB-33 began it became clear that a twin-engined aircraft would not achieve the performance requested by the army. The company moved on to developing a larger four-engined design, the XB-33A.

XB-33A
Following the abandonment of the original twin-engined design, the company continued to design a larger four-engined aircraft, and two prototypes were ordered by the USAAF as the XB-33A; its bombload was to have been 12,000 lb (5,443 kg), as much as that of the B-24 Liberator, the heaviest US bomber flown in combat prior to the B-29.

The original XB-33 design was to have been powered by the R-3350, the redesigned XB-33A was to have used Wright R-2600 engines. The main reason for this was the demand for R-3350s for the B-29, one of the most highly valued projects of the Army Air Forces.

On January 17, 1942, the USAAF placed an order for 400 B-33As, to be built at the government-owned plant in Omaha, Nebraska, operated by Martin. On November 25, 1942, the project was cancelled to allow the Omaha plant to concentrate on manufacturing B-29s.

Variants
XB-33
Prototype medium bomber powered by two 1,800 hp (1,343 kW) R-3350 engines, two ordered and cancelled.
XB-33A
Prototype medium bomber powered by four 1,800 hp (1,343 kW) R-2600-15 engines, two ordered and cancelled.
B-33A Super Marauder
Production variant of XB-33A, 400 ordered and cancelled.

Specifications (B-33A, as designed)

See also

References

Notes

Bibliography
 Encyclopedia of American Aircraft
 

1940s United States bomber aircraft
B-33 Super Marauder
Four-engined piston aircraft